The 2018 United States Senate election in Washington took place on November 6, 2018, in order to elect a member of the United States Senate to represent the State of Washington. Incumbent Democrat Maria Cantwell won re-election to a fourth term. 

As of 2023, this is the last time a Democrat running statewide for federal office has won Pacific County.

Nonpartisan blanket primary

Candidates
The primary election featured 30 candidates, a near record amount for a U.S. Senate election in Washington.

Democratic Party

Declared
 Maria Cantwell, incumbent Senator
 Don L. Rivers
 Clint Tannehill
George H. Kalberer
Mohammad Said

Republican Party

Declared
 Joey Gibson, activist and founder of Patriot Prayer
 Goodspaceguy, perennial candidate
 Susan Hutchison, former chair of the Washington State Republican Party
 Rocky De La Fuente, businessman and former presidential candidate
Tim Owen
Matthew D. Heines
Art Coday
John Orlinski
Keith Swank
RC Smith
Dave Bryant
Matt Hawkins
Glen Stockwell

Withdrawn
 Ron Higgins (withdrew May 19, 2018)

Endorsements

Independents

Declared
 Jennifer "GiGi" Ferguson
Thor Amundson
Dave Strider
Charlie R Jackson
Jon Butler

Write-in
Clay Johnson, activist

Minor parties
In Washington, primary candidates may declare a preference for any party, and their party preference does not imply that the candidate is nominated or endorsed by the party. Candidates may also declare a preference for new or single-candidate parties.

Declared
Mike Luke (Libertarian Party)
Brad Chase (FDFR Party), communications strategist
Sam Wright (The Human Rights Party)
Alex Tsimerman (StandupAmerica)
Steve Hoffman (Freedom Socialist Party), union organizer
James Robert "Jimmie" Deal (Green Party)

Notes

Results

General election

Debates
Complete video of debate, October 8, 2018
Complete video of debate, October 20, 2018

Predictions

Polling

Maria Cantwell vs. Rob McKenna

Results

By congressional district
Cantwell won 7 of 10 congressional districts with the remaining 3 going to Hutchison.

Notes

Partisan clients

References

External links
Candidates at Vote Smart
Candidates at Ballotpedia
Campaign finance at FEC
Campaign finance at OpenSecrets

Official campaign websites
Maria Cantwell (D) for Senate
Susan Hutchison (R) for Senate

2018
Washington
United States Senate